Matías Vecino Falero (born 24 August 1991) is a Uruguayan professional footballer who plays as a midfielder for Serie A club Lazio and the Uruguay national team.

Club career

Early career
Vecino started his professional career with Central Español in 2010, and switched to Nacional for the 2011–12 season.

Fiorentina
In January 2013, Vecino joined Serie A side Fiorentina by penning a four-year contract for a reported transfer fee of €2.5 million. However, the transfer was delayed and became official in the next transfer window in August 2013.

On 3 September 2013, he was not included by manager Vincenzo Montella in UEFA Europa League squad.

Vecino made his competitive debut as well as his first Serie A one on 26 September 2013 in a 2–1 away defeat against Inter Milan. He was used very scarcely during the first part of 2013–14 season, collecting only six appearances, only one as starter, leading the club to send him on loan at fellow Serie A side Cagliari until the end of the season, with an option to buy.

Vecino spent the 2014–15 season on loan at Empoli F.C.

In mid-2015, Vecino returned to Florence and became a member of the first team. He signed a new 5-year contract in 2016.

Inter Milan
On 31 July 2017, Fiorentina authorized Vecino to have a medical with Inter Milan, in order to complete a reported €24 million transfer. The transfer was made official on 2 August, with Vecino signing a contract until June 2021.

He was given squad number 11, and made his competitive debut on 20 August in the opening Serie A matchday against his former side Fiorentina, featuring full-90 minutes as Inter won 3–0. Vecino scored his maiden Inter goal six days later in the next match against Roma, netting the third goal in an eventual 1–3 away win, the first win at Stadio Olimpico over Roma after nine years.

On 20 May 2018, Vecino scored the winning goal vs Lazio, in Inter's 2–3 win, a victory which allowed the club to return to the UEFA Champions League after a six year absence. On 18 September 2018, he scored an injury-time winning goal vs Tottenham Hotspur, in Inter's 2–1 win in the UEFA Champions League.

Lazio
On 1 August 2022, Vecino joined Lazio on a free transfer, signing a three-year contract.

International career
Vecino was born in Canelones, Uruguay, to a family of Italian ancestry, with roots in the city of Campobasso, and was eligible for both national teams. He has been capped by the Uruguay national under-20 football team for the 2011 South American Youth Championship and for the 2011 FIFA U-20 World Cup. He scored the goal to qualify Uruguay for the 2012 Olympic Games in London. Vecino's debut for the Uruguay senior team came on 25 March 2016 against Brazil.

In May 2018, he was named in Uruguay's provisional 26 man squad for the 2018 FIFA World Cup in Russia.

Career statistics

Club

International

International goals
As of match played 2 June 2022. Uruguay score listed first, score column indicates score after each Vecino goal.

Honours

Nacional
 Uruguayan Primera División: 2011–12

Inter Milan
Serie A: 2020–21
Coppa Italia: 2021–22
Supercoppa Italiana: 2021

References

External links

Inter Milan official profile 

1991 births
Living people
People from Canelones Department
Uruguayan footballers
Association football midfielders
Central Español players
Club Nacional de Football players
Cagliari Calcio players
Empoli F.C. players
ACF Fiorentina players
Inter Milan players
S.S. Lazio players
Uruguayan Primera División players
Serie A players
Uruguay under-20 international footballers
Uruguay international footballers
Copa América Centenario players
2018 FIFA World Cup players
2019 Copa América players
2021 Copa América players
2022 FIFA World Cup players
Uruguayan expatriate footballers
Uruguayan expatriate sportspeople in Italy
Expatriate footballers in Italy